2B1 Oka is a Soviet 420 mm self-propelled heavy artillery. 2B1 is its GRAU designation.

Development 
An experimental model was ready in 1957. Its chassis (Object 273), was designed and built by the Kirov Plant. Its 20-meter barrel allowed it to fire 750 kg rounds up to 45 km. Due to its complexity of loading it had a relatively low rate of fire—one round every five minutes. Field tests showed various drawbacks of the entire design (the recoil was too strong for many components: it damaged drive sprockets, ripped the gear-box away from its mountings, etc.) and the sheer length rendered it incredibly difficult to transport.

Its development continued until 1960, when the idea of such overpowered guns (along with the 2A3), was abandoned in favor of tactical ballistic missiles, such as the 2K6 Luna.

See also
 2A3 Kondensator 2P
 List of the largest cannon by caliber

External links

Self-propelled artillery of the Soviet Union
420 mm artillery
Kirov Plant products
Abandoned military projects of the Soviet Union